Caroxazone (Surodil, Timostenil) is an antidepressant which was formerly used for the treatment of depression but is now no longer marketed. It acts as a reversible monoamine oxidase inhibitor (RIMA) of both MAO-A and MAO-B subtypes, with five-fold preference for the latter.

Synthesis 

Synthesis starts by reductive amination of salicylaldehyde and glycinamide to give 3. The synthesis is completed by reaction with phosgene and NaHCO3.

See also 
 Paraxazone, an isomer of Caroxazone

References 

Benzoxazines
Carbamates